Mahima Nambiar is an Indian actress who appears predominantly in Tamil films and in addition to a few Malayalam films.

Early life and career 
Nambiar is from Kasaragod, Kerala. In 2014, she was pursuing a BA in English literature privately. She is a trained classical dancer and a singer.

At age 15, she made her acting debut in the Malayalam film Kaaryasthan, playing Dileep's sister, which she described as a "blink and miss role". She was working as an advertisement model, when the director Samy tried to cast her for Sindhu Samaveli (2010) but she had to decline the offer for personal reasons. The production team later recommended her for Saattai (2012), which was her Tamil film debut. She was in class 12 when she acted in the film, in which she played the lead role of Arivazhagi, a village schoolgirl. After Saattai, she took a year's sabbatical to complete her schooling, and returned to acting with roles in four Tamil films. Her next release was Ennamo Nadakkudhu (2014) in which she appeared as a nurse named Madhu. Later projects include Mosakutty (2014), directed by Jeevan, Puravi 150cc, directed by Cheran's associate Venkat, and Agathinai (2015), directed by Marudhu. She has been signed to play a dual role in Samuthirakani's Kitna.

At the Toronto Tamil International Film Festival 2021, she won the Special Jury Award for Outstanding Performance - Award for Best Supporting Actress for the film  Magamuni.

Filmography 
 All films are in Tamil, Otherwise noted.

Music videos

References

External links 

Actresses from Kerala
Indian film actresses
Living people
Malayali people
Actresses in Tamil cinema
Actresses in Malayalam cinema
21st-century Indian actresses
People from Kasaragod district
Year of birth missing (living people)